Teloxys is a genus of flowering plants belonging to the family Amaranthaceae.

Its native range is Eastern Europe to Temperate Asia.

Species:
 Teloxys aristata (L.) Moq.

References

Chenopodioideae
Amaranthaceae genera